"Lasagna" is a song by "Weird Al" Yankovic. It is a parody of "La Bamba", a traditional song popularized by Ritchie Valens and Los Lobos.

Track listing
 "Lasagna" – 2:45
 "Velvet Elvis" – 4:27

Writing and release
When Yankovic began writing the song, he claimed:

Under U.S. law, Yankovic can parody any song as long as he pays royalties to use the original music. However, as a personal rule, he asks for permission in order to maintain good relations with the industry. This song is an exception to that rule. Although it is a parody of the Los Lobos cover version (in turn a faithful cover of Ritchie Valens's version, though Valens had died in 1959), "Lasagna" marked Yankovic's first parody that did not require permission from an artist or a payment of royalties, since "La Bamba" is a traditional folk song that is not attributed to any specific writer.

The single was released exclusively in Japan as a mini 3" CD single.

Music video
There is no full-length music video for this single, though a shortened music video segment was shown in 1997 as a part of The Weird Al Show.

The video features a stereotypical Italian family, including an elderly woman, two children, a rather large man for "Cousin Luigi" and Yankovic (sans glasses) as the father.
When the line "A-don't you get any on ya, you sloppy pig" is sung, the elderly woman at the dinner table drops the lasagna into Luigi's lap.
After "Have-a more ravioli" is sung, two children catch ravioli in their mouth.
Near the end, lasagna is falling out of Luigi's mouth.
The elderly woman and one of the children fight over the lasagna near the end.
At the end, the family does a dance. First they simply wave from side to side with their hands on each other's shoulders while still seated. Then, they stand up from their chairs, which move off-screen, as does the table. Yankovic takes his plate of lasagna off the table. They all do a can can-type dance as confetti and balloons fall from the ceiling, and at the cheering section at the end, the others gather around Yankovic as he holds out his plate proudly.

Italian dishes mentioned in "Lasagna"
Yankovic names many Italian dishes in "Lasagna", including:

Lasagna
Spaghetti
Calzone
Minestrone
Marinara
Linguini
Fettuccine
Ravioli

In popular culture
"Lasagna" is heard playing on a radio in a cave scene in the 2010 film Yogi Bear.

In the second-season episode of NBC's drama This Is Us entitled "The Car", the Pearson family sings the song to calm mom Rebecca's (Mandy Moore) nerves as they cross a bridge on the way to a Yankovic concert.

See also
 List of singles by "Weird Al" Yankovic
 List of songs by "Weird Al" Yankovic

References

"Weird Al" Yankovic songs
1988 singles
Songs with lyrics by "Weird Al" Yankovic
1988 songs
Scotti Brothers Records singles